The year 2021 in Japanese music.

Debuting

Debuting groups
≠Me
AB6IX
ASP
Be First
Enhypen
Ho6la
INI
Itzy
Loona
Naniwa Danshi
NIK
Rocket Punch
Treasure

Debuting soloists
Aguri Ōnishi
Ai Hashimoto
Anna Suzuki
Daiki Yamashita
Elaiza Ikeda
Hiroki Moriuchi
Marika Kouno
Masato Hayakawa
Miho Okasaki
Miyu Honda
Reina Kondō
Rie Takahashi
Takanori Iwata
Takuma Nagatsuka
Takuya Eguchi
Yurie Neno as a member of Sweet Pop Candy
Wonho

Returning from hiatus

Returning groups
Ajico
Funky Monkey Babys
Nirgilis
Rythem
TM Network

Returning soloists
Fullkawa Honpo
Yūzō Kayama
Noriyuki Makihara
Shiori Niiyama
Naoya Urata

Events
72nd NHK Kōhaku Uta Gassen

Number-ones
Oricon number-one albums
Oricon number-one singles
Hot 100 number-one singles

Awards
63rd Japan Record Awards
2021 MTV Video Music Awards Japan

Albums released

January

February

March

April

May

June

July

August

September

October

November

December

Disbanding and retiring artists

Disbanding
100%
AŌP
Ayumikurikamaki
Blu-Billion
Cellchrome
CY8ER
Desurabbits
GFriend
Hotshot
Iz*One
Maison Book Girl
OnePixcel
Pink Cres.
Sakura Gakuin
V6

Retiring
Saki Shimizu
Chinami Tokunaga
Nana Yamada
Mika Sakaki as a member of Sweet Pop Candy

Going on hiatus
Gackt
Rikiya Higashihara
Kariyushi58
Maon Kurosaki
Silent Siren
Suchmos
Tokyo Performance Doll

References